Chris Cuffaro (born April 14, 1960) is an American photographer.  Primarily known for his portraits of musicians, Cuffaro has photographed Michael Hutchence, Henry Rollins, George Michael, George Harrison and Jane's Addiction, among others.  He was closely associated with the Seattle rock scene of the early 1990s, and frequently photographed artists including Nirvana and Pearl Jam.

Cuffaro made several music videos.  Most notably, he directed the first video for the Pearl Jam song "Jeremy."  Although Pearl Jam's label supported the effort - Cuffaro and Eddie Vedder had become friends—the label ultimately shelved the black-and-white video, instead commissioning a more commercial video when "Jeremy" was released as a single in 1991.

Composed of 100 photographs, the first exhibition of Cuffaro's photography was held in Los Angeles in 1992. In 2011, his portraits of Michael Hutchence and INXS were exhibited in London. Titled  Michael Hutchence & INXS: Rare & Unseen by Chris Cuffaro, it was held at the Gallery Soho. In 2014, work began on Cuffaro's Greatest Hits,an exhibit based on Cuffaro's 30-year career as a photographer.  The exhibitions will be accompanied by a documentary.

Exhibitions 
Ministry: Los Angeles | 1992 -  Chris’s first music photography exhibition was at Ministry Cafe on La Brea Ave. in Los Angeles.  There were 31 large framed photos showing the versatility of Chris’s work.  It was a curated collection of his best black & white music portraits.

Greatest Hits: Los Angeles | 2017 -  Greatest Hits: Los Angeles was a premiere retrospective celebrating the work of Chris Cuffaro.  To share his story, Chris chose 100 photographs that represented his most iconic images, artists and moments in his career - his GREATEST HITS. The exhibition was an experience as visceral as rock n' roll itself, featuring oversize prints, exclusive musical performances, an interactive storytelling component and a host of tastemakers and influencers from the entertainment, art, media and pop culture spheres, staged in a completely non traditional environment at Tower Records on Sunset Blvd. in Hollywood, CA.

Greatest Hits: Martini Ranch | 2017 -  Greatest Hits: Martini Ranch took place at Mr. Musichead Gallery on Sunset Blvd. in Hollywood.  Portraits and Behind-The-Scenes shots lined the walls to celebrate the 30th Anniversary of James Cameron’s music video “Reach” for the band Martini Ranch.

Martini Ranch featured Bill Paxton & Andrew Todd.  The video was filled with a who’s who of Bill’s friends… Kathryn Bigelow, Lance Henriksen, Paul Reiser, Jenette Goldstein, Judge Reinhold, Brian Thompson, Adrian Pasdar, Bud Cort, Mark Rolston, Phillip Granger and so many more.

Greatest Hits: George Michael | 2018 -  Greatest Hits: George Michael was held at Black Eye Gallery in Sydney, Australia.  The exhibition included images from 1987 for the FAITH video through 1988 for the FAITH Tour.  Chris shot the publicity shoot for the label and still photography for George’s music videos including Faith, Monkey, One More Try, Father Figure and Kissing a Fool.  This exhibition captured the essence of the Icon and the majesty of the FAITH Tour.

Greatest Hits: Grunge | 2019 - Greatest Hits: Grunge was at Blender Gallery in Sydney, Australia.  The exhibition include images of Pearl Jam, Nirvana, Soundgarden, Alice In Chains, Mudhoney, Chris Cornell and more Chris Cuffaro said it best " I’m certainly no expert on the Grunge scene or Seattle - there are plenty of those in Seattle.  I have my opinion on what is Grunge and what is not.  I was an outsider who was welcomed into the best party ever and as always, I’ve got the photos to prove it."

Greatest Hits: Pearl Jam | 2019 - Greatest Hits: Pearl Jam took place at Mr Musichead Gallery in Los Angeles, California.  This exhibition celebrated iconic images of Pearl Jam from 1991 to 1992.  From the photos you know, to the never seen before photos, Greatest Hits: Pearl Jam celebrated those historic moments.   The exhibition was a complete collection of Chris’s time with the Hall of Fame band Pearl Jam.  The exhibition was also a fundraiser for Wags&Walks dog rescue.

Greatest Hits: Michael Hutchence | 2019 - Greatest Hits: Michael Hutchence will take place at Blender Gallery in Sydney, Australia. The exhibition includes images of Hutchence taken in 1993 for Detour magazine.

References

External links 
 Cuffaro Hits (Official Site)
 Cuffaro Photo (Official Site)
 Cuffaro Plus (Official Site)

1960 births
Living people
People from San Jose, California